State Highway 15 (West Bengal), is a state highway in West Bengal, India.

Route
SH 15 originates from junction with SH 6 and SH 14 at High Road Morh, near Dainhat (in Bardhaman district) and passes through Chandrapur, Monteswar, Kusumgram, Memari, Masagram, Jamalpur, Tarakeswar, Champadanga, Masat, Chanditala, Dankuni, Domjur, Bargachia, Munsirhat, Amta, Bagnan, Khalor and Shyampur and terminates at Gadiara (in Howrah district). Recently in January 2022, the road from Dharsa Morh to Naity Block Development Office(BDO), commonly known as Naity Road has been renumbered as State Highway 15A(SH-15A) since the road is connecting Grand Trunk Road with National Highway 19(NH-19) and further with SH 15.

The total length of SH 15 is 242 km.

National Highway Authority of India or NHAI has proposed to include section of SH 15 from Champadanga via Masat, Chanditala to Dankuni under a new National Highway from 2022/23. But Highway number is still not decided & will be notified later. The new highway will connect Jhargram with Dankuni via Jhilimili, Mukutmanipur, Simlapal, Taldangra, Bishnupur, Jaypur, Kotulpur, Arambag, Champadanga & Chanditala.

Districts traversed by SH 15 are:
Bardhaman district (from 0 to 87.66 km)Hooghly district (from 87.66 to 148.15 km)Howrah district (from 148.15 to 247.15 km)

Road sections 
It is divided into different sections as follows:

See also
List of state highways in West Bengal

References

State Highways in West Bengal